In pre-Islamic Arabian tradition, Zarqa al-Yamama was a blue-eyed woman from Jadīs with exceptional intuition, keen sight, and ability to predict events before they happened.

Zarqa al-Yamama’s legend
According to the ancient tale, Zarqa's tribe relied on her powers in detecting enemies and defending their land; as she was believed to have the ability to see riders from the distance of one week. In hopes to evade Zarqa's gaze, enemies of her tribe decided to hide behind trees which they carried. Zarqa noticed what was going on and alerted her tribe that the trees were moving towards them and that they hid soldiers behind them. To her dismay, members of her tribe thought she was going mad and choose to ignore her warning. The troops of Hassan al-Himyari eventually reached her tribe and killed every man in the camp, then they tore out Zarqa's eyes and crucified her.

References

Sources

Arab women
Arabian mythology
Arab culture
Society of the Arab world